"In the Stone" is a song by R&B/funk band Earth, Wind & Fire issued as a single in 1979 on Columbia Records. The song rose to No. 23 on the Billboard Hot Soul Songs chart.

Overview
"In the Stone" was produced by Maurice White, who composed the song with Allee Willis and David Foster. The single also came off Earth, Wind & Fire's 1979 album I Am.

Critical reception
Phyl Garland of Stereo Review wrote "In the Stone is less imaginative than many of Earth, Wind & Fire's previous efforts, but performing gusto compensates for the slim substance." 
Ace Adams of the New York Daily News called "In the Stone" one of the album's "best songs."  Cash Box said it was "an irresistable dancing cut" that "moves to a swinging mixture of catchy percussives and intricately woven harmonies." Record World predicted that it would become a "smash hit."

Covers
"In the Stone" was covered by Dionne Warwick on her 1981 album Hot! Live and Otherwise.

“In the Stone” was covered on the album “Fly Away - the Songs of David Foster”, released in 2009 and sung by Bill Champlin. 

“In the Stone" was covered by Leonid and Friends for their 2022 tour.

Appearances in other media
"In the Stone" appeared on the soundtrack of the 2002 feature film Drumline.

Personnel 

 Writing, lyrics – Allee Willis, David Foster, Maurice White
 Producer – Maurice White

Production

 Horn arrangement – Jerry Hey
 String arrangement – David Foster
 Programmer – Steve Porcaro

Engineers

 Engineer – George Massenburg, Tom Perry
 Mixing engineer – George Massenburg
 Assistant engineer – Craig Widby, Ross Pallone

Performers

 Saxophone – Fred Jackson Jr., Herman Riley, Jerome Richardson
 Alto saxophone, baritone saxophone – Don Myrick
 Tenor saxophone – Andrew Woolfolk, Don Myrick
 Bass – Meyer Rubin, Susan Ranney, Verdine White
 Drums – Fred White, Maurice White
 Guitar – Al McKay, Johnny Graham, Marlo Henderson, Steve Lukather
 Congas – Philip Bailey
 Keyboards – Bill Myers, David Foster, Eddie Del Barrio
 Percussion – Maurice White, Paulinho Da Costa, Philip Bailey, Ralph Johnson
 Piano, synthesizer – Larry Dunn
 Timpani – Richard Lepore
 French horn - Barbara Korn, Marilyn Robinson, Richard Perissi, Sidney Muldrow
 Trombone – Benjamin Powell, Garnett Brown, George Bohanon, Louis Satterfield, Maurice Spears, William Reichenbach
 Trumpet - Bobby Bryant, Elmer Brown Jr., Jerry Hey, Michael Harris, Oscar Brashear, Rahmlee Michael Davis, Steve Madaio
 Viola - Barbara Thomason, Linda Lipsett, Norman Forrest, Renita Koven
 Violin - Barry Socher, Betty Lamagna, Carl LaMagna, David Stockhammer, Haim Shtrum, Harris Goldman, Jack Gootkin, Lya Stern, Marcia Van Dyke, Mary D. Lundquist, Ronald Clark, Ruth Henry, Sheldon Sanov
 Cello – Daniel Smith, Jan Kelley, Ronald Cooper, Concert Master, Janice Gower
 Harp – Dorothy Jeanne Ashby
 Vocal - Maurice White, Philip Bailey
 Background Vocal – Maurice White, Philip Bailey

Chart positions

References

1979 singles
Earth, Wind & Fire songs
Songs written by Allee Willis
Songs written by David Foster
Songs written by Maurice White
1979 songs
Columbia Records singles